The City of the Caesars (Spanish Ciudad de los Césares), also variously known as City of Patagonia, the Wandering City, Trapalanda or Trapananda, Lin Lin or Elelín, is a mythical city of South America. It was supposedly located somewhere in Patagonia, in a valley of the Andes between Chile and Argentina. Despite being searched for during the colonization of South America, no evidence proves that it ever existed, although reports of it circulated for two hundred years. In 1766 a Jesuit, Father José García Alsue, explored the area now part of Queulat National Park in Aysén Region, Chile, searching unsuccessfully for the City of the Caesars.

Myth
The city is described as prosperous and rich, plenty of gold, silver and diamonds. At least one description says it was located in between two mountains, somewhere in the Andes mountains, one of gold and another of diamonds. Sometimes it is described as an enchanted city that appears in certain moments; or such that those who come upon it by chance in their travels forget the encounter; or such that hunters of it will walk away with mountains of fortune and treasure. Its purported founders include survivors of a Spanish shipwreck in the Strait of Magellan, survivors in exile of the Destruction of the Seven Cities, ghosts,  Patagonian giants and survivors of the Inca Empire; indeed, one explanation of the legend is that it derived from stories told to sailors by aborigines describing the Empire of Peru.

In popular media
Charles Sheffield's science fiction story "Trapalanda" (in Asimov's Science Fiction, June, 1987) is built around a quest to find Trapalanda.
 Tripura (mythology)

See also

City of Gold (disambiguation)
El Dorado
Seven Cities of Gold
Sierra de la Plata
Tripura (mythology)

References

Carl Waldman, Jon Cunningham, Encyclopedia of Exploration, New York 2004, 
Memoria Chilena Portal de la cultura de Chile. La búsqueda de la Ciudad de los Césares. 2004.  (in Spanish)

Chilean mythology
Chilean legends
History of Patagonia
Exploration of Chile
Governorate of the Río de la Plata
Mythical utopias
Mythological populated places
Fictional populated places in Chile